Nick Kerasiotis (July 4, 1918 – May 23, 2002) was an American football guard. He played for the Chicago Bears in 1942 and 1945.

References

1918 births
2002 deaths
Players of American football from Chicago
American football guards
St. Ambrose Fighting Bees football players
Iowa Hawkeyes football players
Chicago Bears players